Wang Rong (234–305), courtesy name Junchong (濬冲), nickname A Rong (阿戎) was a Chinese military general, poet, and politician of the Western Jin dynasty. He was also one of the Seven Sages of the Bamboo Grove.

Life
Wang Rong served under the Jin dynasty as a military general and participated in the conquest of the Jin dynasty's rival state, Eastern Wu in 280. During the campaign, he led his troops as far as to that of Wuchang (武昌; present day Ezhou, Hubei). Following this, Wang Rong's army merged with Wang Jun's and they advanced towards the Wu capital, Jianye.

Family 
Grandfather: Wang Xiong (王雄), Wei's office of regional inspector (cishi) of You Prefecture (幽州刺史)
Father: Wang Hun (王浑), cishi of Liang Prefecture (凉州刺史)

See also 
 Lists of people of the Three Kingdoms

References

 Fang, Xuanling (ed.) (648). Book of Jin (Jin Shu).

Further reading
Book of Jin
Liu Yiqing, A New Account of the Tales of the World

234 births
305 deaths
4th-century Chinese poets
Jin dynasty (266–420) generals
Jin dynasty (266–420) poets
Jin dynasty (266–420) politicians
Seven Sages of the Bamboo Grove
People of Cao Wei
Political office-holders in Henan
Political office-holders in Shanxi